Yves Daccord is a renowned humanitarian leader, international strategist, influencer and changemaker. His current focus is on the theme of security, social contract and the role of cities at the age of digital surveillance and pandemics, which is the subject of a special initiative he is leading at Harvard's Berkman Klein Center for Internet and society. From 2010 – March 2020 Yves was Director-General of the International Committee of the Red Cross (ICRC), a global humanitarian organization employing 20,000 staff. A former journalist, TV producer and international relations expert, his ICRC career spanned more than two decades in a variety of posts and challenging contexts – including Israel and the Occupied Territories, Sudan, Yemen, Chechnya and Georgia. 

Yves is a Commissioner of the #Principles4Peace initiative. He is a member of the Board of Trustees of ODI, of the Board of the International Film Festival and Forum on Human Rights of Geneva, of the Board of the leading swiss newspaper Le Temps and of the Board of the Humanitarian Quality Insurance Initiative. He has been appointed in March 2022 as a senior advisor for the EssentialTech Center of EPFL, the Swiss federal institute of technology in Lausanne. He also continues to serve as Vice-Chair of the advisory board of The Performance Theatre, a position he has held since June 2015. Yves holds a degree in political science and an honorary doctorate in social sciences from the University of St. Gallen, awarded in 2017.

Early life and education
Yves Daccord was born in Zürich, Switzerland. He attended the Collège Saint-Michel in Fribourg before pursuing his studies at the University of Geneva, where he graduated with a Bachelor of Arts in political science and international relations in 1986. He subsequently pursued postgraduate training as a broadcast journalist, and began working at Radio Télévision Suisse in Geneva in 1987.

Professional career at the ICRC

Daccord joined the ICRC in 1992, running humanitarian operations in various challenging contexts of armed conflict including Israel and the Occupied Territories, Sudan, Yemen, Chechnya and Georgia. He held a number of progressively senior positions within the organisation, including Head of Communication Division (1998-2002) and Director of Communications (2002-2010) before his appointment as Director-General in 2010.

As Director-General, Daccord has overseen a period of transformative change within the ICRC in response to ever-increasing humanitarian needs in armed conflicts and other situations of violence around the world. As the organisation has seen significant growth in its operations in recent years, employing some 16,000 people in more than 80 countries (as of 2017), Daccord has spearheaded significant institutional reforms in areas such as human resources and people management; partnerships and stakeholder management; and innovation and technology
. He has spoken and published widely on key issues such as violence against health care ; the risks and opportunities of new technologies in the humanitarian sector; global humanitarian affairs; and the future of humanitarian action.

Titles and honours
In 2014, Daccord was appointed to the chair of the Steering Committee for Humanitarian Response(SCHR), a voluntary alliance of nine of the world's leading humanitarian organisations. In 2015, World Health Organization(WHO) Director-General Margaret Chan appointed Daccord as a member of the Advisory Group on Reform of WHO's Work in Outbreaks and Emergencies with Health and Humanitarian Consequences.  In May 2017, he was awarded an Honorary Doctor's degree in Social Sciences by the University of St. Gallen, in recognition of his “outstanding services to the fortunes of the ICRC.”

Personal life
Daccord is married and father of three daughters. He lives in Switzerland.

References

1964 births
Red Cross personnel
Living people
University of Geneva alumni
Swiss television journalists
Place of birth missing (living people)